Tetbury Upton is a small village and civil parish in the Cotswolds area of Gloucestershire, England. Upton and Doughton were historically tythings in the ancient parish of Tetbury, and the area became a separate civil parish in 1894. By 1901 Tetbury Upton's total population reached 905, but by 2011 the population had declined to 309.

Upton House is a Neoclassical country house built in 1752, whose design is usually attributed to William Halfpenny, of Bristol.  The parish also includes Highgrove House near Doughton.

Despite its small size the parish is the most populous in 'Grumbolds Ash' electoral ward. This ward starts in the south west at Didmarton passes Tetbury Upton, and ends in the north west at Kingscote. The total ward population taken at the 2011 census was 1,887.

References

External links
 Tetbury Upton Parish Council

Villages in Gloucestershire
Civil parishes in Gloucestershire
Cotswold District